Wrocław is one of the largest university centers in Poland. About 150 thousand people study here, both full-time and part-time.

State universities

 K. Lipiński Academy of Music
 E. Geppert Academy of Fine Arts
 S. Wyspiański Academy of Theatre Arts
 T. Kościuszko Land Forces Academy
 Academy of Physical Education
 Wroclaw University of Technology
 University of Economics
 Piast Medical University of Silesia
 University of Life Sciences
 University of Wroclaw

Non-state universities
 Lower Silesian University of Applied Sciences
 Evangelical College of Theology
 Metropolitan Higher Seminary
 International School of Logistics and Transport
 Non-public Higher School of Medicine
 Papal Theological Faculty
 SWPS University of Humanities and Social Sciences in Warsaw, Branch Office in Wrocław
 University of Arts and Crafts and Management
 Wrocław University of Applied Computer Science
 School of Banking
 University of Philology
 University of Physiotherapy
 College of Commerce
 Higher School of Humanities
 Copernicus University of Information Technology and Management
 Chodkowska University of Law
 Higher School of Management
 University of Management and Coaching
 Franciscan Theological Seminary
 Seminary of the Fathers of Claretinas
 Heart Fathers' Major Seminary

See also 
 Wrocław

Notes and references

 
Wrocław
 
Wrocław